The IEEE Visualization Conference (VIS) is an annual conference on scientific visualization, information visualization, and visual analytics administrated by the IEEE Computer Society Technical Committee on Visualization and Graphics. As ranked by Google Scholar's h-index metric in 2016, VIS is the highest rated venue for visualization  research and the second-highest rated conference for computer graphics over all. It has an 'A' rating from the Australian Ranking of ICT Conferences, an 'A' rating from the Brazilian ministry of education, and an 'A' rating from the China Computer Federation (CCF). The conference is highly selective with generally < 25% acceptance rates for all papers.

An image dataset, VIS30K, has been created from figures and tables in the conference publications.

Location 
The conference is held in October and rotates around the US generally West, Central and East. In 2014, for its 25th anniversary, the conference took place for the first time outside of the US, namely in Paris.

List of conferences:
  2022: Oklahoma City, United States (hybrid)
  2021: New Orleans, United States (online)
  2020: Salt Lake City, United States (online)
  2019: Vancouver, Canada
  2018: Berlin, Germany
  2017: Phoenix, Arizona, United States
  2016: Baltimore, Maryland, United States
  2015: Chicago, Illinois, United States
  2014: Paris, France
  2013: Atlanta, Georgia, United States
  2012: Seattle, Washington, United States
  2011: Providence, Rhode Island, United States
  2010: Salt Lake City, Utah, United States
  2009: Atlantic City, New Jersey, United States
  2008: Columbus, Ohio, United States
  2007: Sacramento, California, United States
  2006: Baltimore, Maryland, United States
  2005: Minneapolis, Minnesota, United States
  2004: Austin, Texas, United States
  2003: Seattle, Washington, United States
  2002: Boston, Massachusetts, United States
  2001: San Diego, California, United States
  2000: Salt Lake City, Utah, United States
  1999: San Francisco, California, United States
  1998: Research Triangle Park, North Carolina, United States
  1997: Phoenix, Arizona, United States
  1996: San Francisco, California, United States
  1995: Atlanta, Georgia, United States
  1994: Washington DC, United States
  1993: San Jose, California, United States
  1992: Boston, Massachusetts, United States
  1991: San Diego, California, United States
  1990: San Francisco, California, United States

Awards

VIS Best Paper Award

2019:
VAST
FlowSense: A Natural Language Interface for Visual Data Exploration within a Dataflow System: Bowen Yu, Claudio Silva
InfoVis
Data Changes Everything: Challenges and Opportunities in Data Visualization Design Handoff: Jagoda Walny, Christian Frisson, Mieka West, Doris Kosminsky, Søren Knudsen, Sheelagh Carpendale, Wesley Willett
SciVis
InSituNet: Deep Image Synthesis for Parameter Space Exploration of Ensemble Simulations: Wenbin He, Junpeng Wang, Hanqi Guo, Ko-Chih Wang, Han-Wei Shen, Mukund Raj, Youssef S. G. Nashed, Tom Peterka

2018:
VAST
TPFlow: Progressive Partition and Multidimensional Pattern Extraction for Large-Scale Spatio-Temporal Data Analysis, Dongyu Liu, Panpan Xu, Liu Ren
InfoVis
Formalizing Visualization Design Knowledge as Constraints: Actionable and Extensible Models in Draco, Dominik Moritz, Chenglong Wang, Greg L. Nelson, Halden Lin, Adam M. Smith, Bill Howe, Jeffrey Heer
SciVis
Deadeye: A Novel Preattentive Visualization Technique Based on Dichoptic Presentation Authors: Andrey Krekhov, Jens Krüger

2017:
VAST
Visualizing Dataflow Graphs of Deep Learning Models in TensorFlow, Kanit Wongsuphasawat, Daniel Smilkov, James Wexler, Jimbo Wilson, Dandelion Mané, Doug Fritz, Dilip Krishnan, Fernanda B. Viégas, and Martin Wattenberg
InfoVis
Modeling Color Difference for Visualization Design, Danielle Albers Szafir
SciVis
Globe Browsing: Contextualized Spatio-Temporal Planetary Surface Visualization, Karl Bladin, Emil Axelsson, Erik Broberg, Carter Emmart, Patric Ljung, Alexander Bock, and Anders Ynnerman

2016:
VAST
An Analysis of Machine- and Human-Analytics in Classification, Gary K.L. Tam, Vivek Kothari, Min Chen
InfoVis
Vega-Lite: A Grammar of Interactive Graphics, Arvind Satyanarayan, Dominik Moritz, Kanit Wongsuphasawat, and Jeffrey Heer
SciVis
Jacobi Fiber Surfaces for Bivariate Reeb Space Computation, Julien Tierny and Hamish Carr

2015
VAST
Reducing Snapshots to Points: A Visual Analytics Approach to Dynamic Network Exploration, Stef van den Elzen, Danny Holten, Jorik Blaas, Jarke van Wijk
InfoVis
HOLA: Human-like Orthogonal Network Layout, Steve Kieffer, Tim Dwyer, Kim Marriott, Michael Wybrow
SciVis
Visualization-by-Sketching: An Artist’s Interface for Creating Multivariate Time-Varying Data, David Schroeder, Daniel Keefe

2014
VAST
Supporting Communication and Coordination in Collaborative Sensemaking, Narges Mahyar, Melanie Tory
InfoVis
Multivariate Network Exploration and Presentation: From Detail to Overview via Selections and Aggregations, Stef van den Elzen, Jarke van Wijk
SciVis
Visualization of Brain Microstructure through Spherical Harmonics Illumination of High Fidelity Spatio-Angular Fields, Sujal Bista, Jiachen Zhou, Rao Gullapalli, Amitabh Varshney

2013
VAST
A Partition-Based Framework for Building and Validating Regression Models, Thomas Muhlbacher, Harald Piringer
InfoVis
LineUp: Visual Analysis of Multi-Attribute Rankings, Samuel Gratzl, Alexander Lex, Nils Gehlenborg, Hanspeter Pfister, Marc Streit
SciVis
Comparative Visual Analysis of Lagrangian Transport in CFD Ensembles, Mathias Hummel, Harald Obermaier, Christoph Garth, Kenneth I. Joy

Technical Achievement Award

Past recipients:
2020 - Jean-Daniel Fekete
2019 - Eduard Gröller
2018 - Anders Ynnerman
2017 - Jeffrey Heer
2016 - David Ebert
2015 - Tamara Munzner
2014 - Claudio T. Silva
2013 - Kwan-Liu Ma
2012 - John Stasko
2011 - Daniel A. Keim
2010 - Hanspeter Pfister
2009 - Jock D. Mackinlay
2008 - David Laidlaw
2007 - Jarke van Wijk
2006 - Thomas Ertl
2005 - Charles D. Hansen
2004 - Amitabh Varshney

Career Award
To earn the IEEE VGTC Visualization Career Award, an individual must demonstrate that their research and service has had broad impacts on the field over a long period of time.

Past recipients:
2020 - Catherine Plaisant
2019 - Thomas Ertl
2018 - Sheelagh Carpendale
2017 - Charles D. Hansen
2016 - John C. Dill
2015 - Markus Gross
2014 - Kenneth Joy
2013 - Gregory M. Nielson
2012 - Ben Shneiderman
2011 - Frits Post
2010 - Christopher R. Johnson
2009 - Hans Hagen
2008 - Lawrence J. Rosenblum
2007 -  Stuart Card
2006 - Pat Hanrahan
2005 - Arie Kaufman
2004 - Bill Lorensen

References

IEEE conferences
Computer science conferences
IEEE society and council awards
Visualization (research)